Coleophora orientalis is a moth of the family Coleophoridae. It is found in Wudalianchi, China.

References

orientalis
Moths described in 1998
Moths of Asia